Saturday the 14th is a 1981 American comedy horror film starring real-life husband and wife Paula Prentiss and Richard Benjamin, co-written and directed by Howard R. Cohen and produced by Julie Corman.

Despite the implications of the film's title, it is a spoof of classic horror movies from the 1930s and 1940s, and not a parody of the Friday the 13th series or slasher films of that type from the 1980s. It was followed by Saturday the 14th Strikes Back in 1988.

Plot
An all-American family inherits a deceased uncle's house. John and Mary Hyatt, together with daughter Debbie and son Billy move in, but Waldemar, a vampire, and Yolanda, his wife, want desperately to get into the rundown house because it contains a book of evil.

Billy finds the mysterious book. He reads of a curse hanging over the date of Saturday the 14th. As he turns the page, a monster is unleashed and with each turn, another disappears from the page and is materialized within or outside the home. The house is soon swarming with monsters.

Strange things start happening: eyes appear in John's coffee, sandwiches are mysteriously eaten, the television tunes into The Twilight Zone only, dirt is found in Mary's bed, dishes get done by themselves, neighbors disappear. As this is happening, neither John or Mary suspect anything, completely oblivious to the spooky occurrences around them.

Waldemar gets into the house by turning into a bat. Mary keeps hearing noises at night, which she thinks are made by owls, but are actually the sounds of Waldemar in bat form. John hires an exterminator to get rid of the bats. The exterminator turns out to be Van Helsing, who is also after the book of evil.

John and Mary begin planning a housewarming party for Saturday the 14th. Guests arrive, but they cannot leave. When they try, a thunderstorm appears outside the door. As the night unfolds, the monsters begin to kill the guests one by one.

Eventually a duel between Van Helsing and Waldemar and Yolanda erupts, where it is discovered that Van Helsing wants the book in order to rule the world and Waldemar and Yolanda were only trying to stop him from getting his hands on it. Good triumphs over evil, as Van Helsing and the monsters are defeated.

The Hyatts end up in an upscale new home, while Waldemar and Yolanda keep the original house as their own.

Cast
Richard Benjamin as John Hyatt, the father of the family
Paula Prentiss as Mary Hyatt, the mother of the family
Jeffrey Tambor as Waldemar, vampire looking to buy the house
Severn Darden as Van Helsing, evil genius disguised as an exterminator
Kari Michaelsen as Debbie Hyatt, daughter of John and Mary
Rosemary DeCamp as Aunt Lucille
Kevin Brando as Billy Hyatt, son of John and Mary
Nancy Lee Andrews as Yolanda, wife of the vampire Waldermar
Stacy Keach Sr. as Attorney
Roberta Collins as Cousin Rhonda
Paul 'Mousie' Garner as The Major

Release
The film was given a limited release theatrically in the United States by New World Pictures on August 14, 1981, opening in cities such as Des Moines, Iowa and Alexandria, Louisiana. It premiered in Los Angeles on November 20.

Critical response
Variety called the film "a pathetic farce which will seem frail even on TV, for which it should probably have been made in the first place...As usual with recent New World productions, the special effects and, in this case, the monster get-ups are actually pretty good, but they exist in a vacuum of inspiration as to what to do with them". Vincent Canby of The New York Times dismissed it as "an unfunny horror-film parody". Gene Siskel of the Chicago Tribune gave the film one star out of four and labeled it "a feeble comedy with a husband-and-wife star acting team mugging in front of the camera. Comedies don't need stars. They just need jokes, and Saturday the 14th doesn't have many". Tom Shales of The Washington Post wrote that the film "merely resurrects a passel of haunted-house wheezes so antique that even the Bowery Boys would be driven to groans by them". He thought that children might enjoy it, but "that's really not enough to base a movie on". Linda Gross of the Los Angeles Times wrote that it was "not a laugh riot, but a silly spoof of horror movies whose appeal probably will be limited to younger people who haven't been exposed to making fun of Dracula for as long as the rest of us".

The film has an approval rating of 10% on Rotten Tomatoes based on 10 reviews, with an average score of 3.4 out of 10.

Home media
It was later released on VHS and CED Videodisc by Embassy Home Entertainment.

The film was released on DVD by New Concorde Home Entertainment in 2001. This release is currently out of print.

Scream Factory released Blu-ray edition of the film on January 15, 2019.

References

External links 

 
 

1981 directorial debut films
1981 comedy films
1980s English-language films
1980s American films
1980s comedy horror films
1981 films
1981 horror films
American comedy horror films
American haunted house films
American monster movies
American parody films
Films produced by Julie Corman
New World Pictures films
Parodies of horror